Michael Creighton may refer to:

 Michael Cyril Creighton, American actor and writer
 Michael W. Creighton, bishop of the Episcopal Diocese of Central Pennsylvania

See also
 Michael Crichton, American author and filmmaker